Carolyn George (September 6, 1927 – February 10, 2009) was an American ballerina, photographer, and dance instructor.

Life and career
Born in Dallas, Texas, George was descended from some of the first settlers in Waco, Texas. She studied at the School of American Ballet (SAB) and at the San Francisco Ballet's school. She started her professional dance career in 1952 in Broadway musicals and joined New York City Ballet (NYCB) on its European tour that year in George Balanchine's Swan Lake.

She rose to the rank of soloist, created roles in Todd Bolender's Souvenirs, William Dollar's Five Gifts and Jerome Robbins' Fanfare and appeared in the 1954 revival of On Your Toes, which Balanchine had choreographed.

It was at NYCB that she met her husband Jacques d'Amboise, whom she married on New Years Day, 1956. The couple had four children, including dancers Christopher, who is married to Kelly Crandell, and Charlotte, who is married to Terrence Mann.

Until her death George continued to work as a photographer, having begun at NYCB and SAB; her work appears in her son's autobiography Leap Year: A Year in the Life of a Dancer. She died on February 10, 2009, at her Manhattan home from primary lateral sclerosis, at the age of 81.

Photographs for the book, by Jacques d'Amboise and Hope Cooke, titled Teaching the Magic of Dance, published by Simon & Schuster.

References

Reviews

 NY Times by John Martin, January 21, 1953
 NY Times by John Martin, May 7, 1953
 NY Times, March 1, 1954
 NY Times, September 18, 1954
 NY Times by John Martin, February 18, 1955
 Sunday NY Times by John Martin, October 23, 1955
 NY Times by John Martin, November 10, 1955
 NY Times by John Martin, November 14, 1955
 NY Times by John Martin, November 18, 1955
 NY Times, December 14, 1955
 NY Times by John Martin, March 1, 1956

Articles
  
 Sunday NY Times by John Martin, August 24, 1958

 
 NY Times obituary by Anna Kisselgoff, February 12, 2009

External links
 

1927 births
2009 deaths
American ballerinas
20th-century American photographers
Deaths from motor neuron disease
Neurological disease deaths in New York (state)
New York City Ballet soloists
People from Dallas
Artists from New York City
San Francisco Ballet dancers
House of Amboise
20th-century American women photographers
20th-century American ballet dancers